Reversi is a strategy board game for two players, played on an 8×8 uncheckered board. It was invented in 1883. Othello, a variant with a fixed initial setup of the board, was patented in 1971.

Basics
There are sixty-four identical game pieces called disks, which are light on one side and dark on the other. Players take turns placing disks on the board with their assigned color facing up. During a play, any disks of the opponent's color that are in a straight line and bounded by the disk just placed and another disk of the current player's color are turned over to the current player's color. The objective of the game is to have the majority of disks turned to display one's color when the last playable empty square is filled.

History

Original version 
Englishmen Lewis Waterman and John W. Mollett both claim to have invented the game of Reversi in 1883, each denouncing the other as a fraud. The game gained considerable popularity in England at the end of the 19th century. The game's first reliable mention is in the 21 August 1886 edition of The Saturday Review. Later mention includes an 1895 article in The New York Times, which describes Reversi as "something like Go Bang, [...] played with 64 pieces." In 1893, the German games publisher Ravensburger started producing the game as one of its first titles. Two 18th century continental European books dealing with a game that may or may not be Reversi are mentioned on page fourteen of the Spring 1989 Othello Quarterly, and there has been speculation, so far without documentation, that the game has older origins.

A Japanese publication in 1907 titled World Games Rules Complete Collection (世界遊戯法大全) describes the board game Reversi with the same rules as Othello where the first four pieces go in the center in a diagonal pattern and the player who cannot make a move simply passes.

Othello 

The modern version of the game—the most regularly used rule-set, and the one used in international tournaments—is marketed and recognized as Othello. Hasegawa initially explained that Othello was an improvement on Reversi, but from around 2000, he began to claim that he invented it in Mito regardless of Reversi. Hasegawa also claims that the origin of Reversi/Othello dates back 5,000 years.

Hasegawa established the Japan Othello Association in March 1973, and held the first national Othello championship on 4 April 1973 in Japan. The Japanese game company Tsukuda Original launched Othello in late April 1973 in Japan under Hasegawa's license, which led to an immediate commercial success.

The name was selected by Hasegawa as a reference to the Shakespearean play Othello, the Moor of Venice, referring to the conflict between the Moor Othello and Iago, and more controversially, to the unfolding drama between Othello, who is black, and Desdemona, who is white. The green color of the board is inspired by the image of the general Othello, valiantly leading his battle in a green field. It can also be likened to a jealousy competition (jealousy being the central theme in Shakespeare's play, which popularized the term "green-eyed monster"), since players engulf the pieces of the opponent, thereby turning them to their possession.

Othello was first launched in the U.S. in 1975 by Gabriel Industries and it also enjoyed commercial success there. Sales have reportedly exceeded $600 million. More than 40 million classic games have been sold in over 100 countries.

Hasegawa's How to play Othello (Osero No Uchikata) in Japan in 1974, was published in 1977 in an English translation entitled How to Win at Othello.

Kabushiki Kaisha Othello, which is owned by Hasegawa, registered the trademark "OTHELLO" for board games in Japan; Tsukuda Original registered the trademark in the rest of the world. All intellectual property regarding Othello outside Japan is now owned by MegaHouse, the Japanese toy company which acquired Tsukuda Original's successor PalBox.

Rules 
Each of the disks' two sides corresponds to one player; they are referred to here as light and dark after the sides of Othello pieces, but any counters with distinctive faces are suitable. The game may for example be played with a chessboard and Scrabble pieces, with one player letters and the other backs.

The historical version of Reversi starts with an empty board, and the first two moves made by each player are in the four central squares of the board. The players place their disks alternately with their colors facing up and no captures are made. A player may choose to not play both pieces on the same diagonal, different from the standard Othello opening. It is also possible to play variants of Reversi and Othello where the second player's second move may or must flip one of the opposite-colored disks (as variants closest to the normal games).

For the specific game of Othello, the game begins with four disks placed in a square in the middle of the grid, two facing light-side-up, two dark-side-up, so that the same-colored disks are on a diagonal. Convention has this such that the dark-side-up disks are to the north-east and south-west (from both players' perspectives), though this is only marginally consequential: where sequential openings' memorization is preferred, such players benefit from this. The dark player moves first.

Dark must place a piece (dark-side-up) on the board and so that there exists at least one straight (horizontal, vertical, or diagonal) occupied line between the new piece and another dark piece, with one or more contiguous light pieces between them. For move one, dark has four options shown by translucently drawn pieces below:

Play always alternates. After placing a dark disk, dark turns over (flips to dark, captures) the single disk (or chain of light disks) on the line between the new piece and an anchoring dark piece. Multiple chains of disks may be captured in a single move. No player can look back to the previous status of disks when playing moves. A valid move is one where at least one piece is reversed (flipped over).

If dark decided to put a piece in the topmost location (all choices are strategically equivalent at this time), one piece gets turned over, so that the board appears thus:

Now light plays. This player operates under the same rules, with the roles reversed: light lays down a light piece, causing a dark piece to flip. Possibilities at this time appear thus (indicated by transparent pieces):

Light takes the bottom left option and reverses one piece:

Players take alternate turns. If one player cannot make a valid move, play passes back to the other player. When neither player can move, the game ends. This occurs when the grid has filled up or when neither player can legally place a piece in any of the remaining squares. This means the game may end before the grid is completely filled. This possibility may occur because one player has no pieces remaining on the board in that player's color. In over-the-board play this is generally scored as if the board were full (64–0).

Examples where the game ends before the grid is completely filled:

The player with the most pieces on the board at the end of the game wins. An exception to this is that if a clock is employed then if one player defaults on time that player's opponent wins regardless of the board configuration, with varying methods to determine the official score where one is required.

In common practice over the Internet, opponents agree upon a time-control of, typically, from one to thirty minutes per game per player. Standard time control in the World Championship is thirty minutes, and this or something close to it is common in over-the-board (as opposed to internet) tournament play generally. In time-defaulted games, where disk differential is used for tie-breaks in tournaments or for rating purposes, one common over-the-board procedure for the winner of defaulted contests to complete both sides' moves with the greater of the result thereby or one disk difference in the winner's favor being the recorded score. Games in which both players have the same number of disks their color at the end (almost always with a full-board 32–32 score) are not very common, but also not rare, and these are designated as 'ties' and scored as half of a win for each player in tournaments. The term 'draw' for such may also be heard, but is somewhat frowned upon.

What are generally referred to as transcript sheets are generally in use in tournament over-the-board play, with both players obligated to record their game's moves by placing the number of each move in an 8×8 grid. This both enables players to look up past games of note and tournament directors and players to resolve disputes (according to whatever specific rules are in place) where claims that an illegal move, flip or other anomaly are voiced. An alternative recording method not requiring a grid is also in use, where positions on a board are labeled left to right by letters a through h and top to bottom (far-to-near) by digits 1 through 8 (Note that this is the opposite of the chess standard, with numerals running upward away from the side (White) that has a through h left to right, and also that the perspective may be that of either player (with no fixed standard)), so that the very first move of a game may be (based upon standard starting setup) d3, c4, f5 or e6. This alternate notational scheme is used primarily in verbal discussions or where a linear representation is desirable in print, but may also be permissible as during-game transcription by either or both players.

Tournament play using ordinary sets rather than a computer interface—where this cannot be an issue—have various ways of handling illegal moves and over- or underflipping (flips that should not be made but are or should be but are not). For example, permitting either player (perpetrator or its opponent) to make a correction going back some fixed number of moves (after which no remedy is available) is one procedure that has been used.

Significant variants of the game, such as where the starting position differs from standard or the objective is to have the fewest pieces one's color at the end, are sometimes—but rarely—played.

Brightwell Quotient 
Invented by the British mathematician and three times runner-up at the World Championship and five times British Champion Graham Brightwell, this is the tie-breaker that is now used in many tournaments including the W.O.C. If two players have the same number of points in the thirteen-round W.O.C. Swiss, the tie is resolved in favour of the player with the higher Brightwell Quotient.

The Brightwell Quotient (BQ) is calculated as follows:
 A constant c is calculated. It is the integer nearest to (number of squares on the board) divided by (number of rounds in the tournament).
 If any of the player's opponents have withdrawn in the course of the tournament, or if a player has been paired against bye, ignore such games for the moment. 
 Calculate the total number of disks scored by the player in all games not covered by step 2 and add c times the sum of points scored by all of the player's opponents, except those who have withdrawn.
 For each game against an opponent who has withdrawn, and each bye received, add half the number of squares on the board plus (c times the player's own tournament score) to the result calculated in step 3. The number resulting is the player's BQ.

Computer opponents and research 

Good Othello computer programs play very strongly against human opponents. This is mostly due to difficulties in human look-ahead peculiar to Othello: The interchangeability of the disks and therefore apparent strategic meaninglessness (as opposed to chess pieces for example) makes an evaluation of different moves much harder. This can be demonstrated with blindfold games, as the memorization of the board demands much more dedication from the players than in blindfold chess.

The first tournament pitting Othello computer programs against human opponents took place in 1980. In it, then world champion Hiroshi Inoue, although he would go on to win the tournament, lost a game against the computer program The Moor. In 1997, the computer Othello program Logistello defeated the reigning human champion, Takeshi Murakami, six games to zero.

Analysts have estimated the number of legal positions in Othello is at most 1028, and it has a game-tree complexity of approximately 1058. Mathematically, Othello still remains unsolved. Experts have not absolutely resolved what the outcome of a game will be where both sides use perfect play. However, analysis of thousands of high-quality games (most of them computer-generated) appears to lead to a reliable conclusion (pending actual proof if true) that, on the standard 8×8 board, perfect play on both sides results in a draw. When generalizing the game to play on an n×n board, the problem of determining if the first player has a winning move in a given position is PSPACE-complete. On 4×4 and 6×6 boards under perfect play, the second player wins. The first of these proofs is relatively trivial, and the second dates to around 1990.

World Othello Championship 
The World Othello Championship (WOC), which started in 1977, was first organized by the Japan Othello Association. From 1978 until 2004, the World Othello Championship was organized by the Othello TD group and Anjar Co. In 2005, the World Othello Federation took over the responsibility for the WOC.

From 1977 to 1986, each country could send one player to participate in the WOC. From 1987, each country could send up to three players to participate. 1987, the title WOC team championship started. In 2005, a female championship category was added to the WOC. From 2006, each World Othello Federation member could send a full team of up to four players. In 2016, a youth champion title was added to the WOC. The WOC was cancelled in 2020 and 2021 due to the COVID-19 pandemic.

Reception
Games magazine included Othello in their "Top 100 Games of 1980", noting that it was "Based on the Victorian game of reversi" and had achieved "remarkable success in this country for an abstract game of strategy".

Games magazine included Othello, Tournament Set in their "Top 100 Games of 1981", noting that by that time "Othello has become so popular that Gabriel now markets a computer version and a players' association publishes a quarterly magazine".

Games magazine included Othello in their "Top 100 Games of 1982", noting that "Although the goal is to finish with the most pieces of your color up, the best strategy, paradoxically, is usually to limit your opponent's options by flipping over as few of his discs as possible during the first two-thirds of the game."

Reviews
Jeux & Stratégie #6

References

External links

 "Othello (Reversi)", University of Waterloo, Elliott Avedon Museum & Archive of Games
 Brian Rose, Othello: A Minute to Learn... A Lifetime to Master, 2005.
 British Othello Federation Newsletters
 Emmanuel Lazard and Federation Francaise d'Othello, "Othello: The Rules of the Game", 1993.

 Pictures of the 19th century reversi boards
 Randy Fang, Othello: From Beginner to Master, 2003.
 Reversi – An Animated Guide
 Ted Landau, Othello: Brief & Basic, 1990.
 World Othello Federation
 World Othello Rating List

 
Board games introduced in the 1880s
Abstract strategy games
PSPACE-complete problems
Pressman Toy Corporation games
Ravensburger games
Discontinued Windows components
Traditional board games
Partially solved games